Makam Diraja Johor Telok Blangah is a Johor royal mausoleum co-located next to the grounds of Masjid Temenggong Daeng Ibrahim in Telok Blangah, Singapore. The royal cemetery is the final resting place of the descendants of the House of Temenggong from 1825 to 1900.

Background
The burial ground was informally established with Temenggong Abdul Rahman being buried there in late December 1825, the burial ground had since become a resting place for later members of the House of Temenggong from then on.

The last to be buried was Ungku Mohd Khalid, the younger brother of Sultan Abu Bakar in 1900.

Notable burials

 Tun Temenggong Abdul Rahman bin Tun Abdul Halim
 Tun Temenggong Daeng Ibrahim bin Tun Abdul Rahman
 Ungku Mohd Khalid bin Tun Ibrahim

See also
 Johor Sultanate
 Tanjong Pagar railway station

References

Cemeteries in Singapore
Malaysian diaspora in Singapore